St Austell by-election may refer to:

 1887 St Austell by-election
 1908 St Austell by-election
 1915 St Austell by-election